Renu Pada Das (born Sadhanpara, Nadia district, 1 December 1927) was member of 5th Lok Sabha from Krishnanagar (Lok Sabha constituency) in West Bengal, India.

He was elected to 6th, 7th and 8th Lok Sabha from Krishanagar constituency in Nadia district.

References

1927 births
People from Nadia district
India MPs 1971–1977
India MPs 1977–1979
India MPs 1980–1984
India MPs 1984–1989
West Bengal politicians
Lok Sabha members from West Bengal
Possibly living people